The NC3 are a model of diesel multiple units operated by China Railway. They were built by Ganz-MAVAG in 1962 and imported from the Hungarian People's Republic to be operated in China. They were not the first DMU to be operated in China; the Dongfeng DMU had been built a few years earlier, but only in a single set.

Operational history 
In 1962, the four sets of NC3 diesel multiple units were put into service with Beijing bureau, Beijing internal combustion sector, and ran the tourist services from Beijing to Tianjin. Some flaws that were pointed out during operation were that there were insufficient seats per carriage, and the seats were too close to each other for comfort, the train was too low in height and became too hot in summer. In June 1975, the Ministry of Railways reassigned all four NC3 and also the imported Hungarian ND1, to Lanzhou bureau, Lanxi sector. In 1978, one of the NC3 was modified into a departmental vehicle, for track inspection and to act as a mobile accident management centre. Afterwards, the remaining cars were disconnected as a multiple unit, and attached to various rescue trains, and they worked in that form until they were withdrawn in 1987.

A few trailer carriages used as storage warehouses survived into the 1990s near Gantang railway station, but by then, the body had significantly degraded and the trains were scrapped sometime later.

Technical features 
The NC3 diesel multiple unit was designed for short distance passenger transportation, and was structurally similar to the  built for the Cezchoslovak State Railways. Each multiple unit consisted two motor cars and two trailer carriages. The motor cars  are numbered from NC3-1 to NC3-8 and can be operated separately from the trailer carriages and can control up to a four motor cars, or two sets. In the motor carriage, the machinery room is located immediately behind the driver's cabin. with the ability to. From the front to the rear of the motor car, the driver's cabin occupies the front, then the machinery room of the motor carriage which contains various piping, water cooling equipment, greasing oils and the diesel fuel, then the luggage stores and water boilers, and finally the passenger cabin. The passenger seats are arranged in a three by two layout, for a total of 78 seats per motor carriage and 118 per trailer carriage for a total capacity of 392 passengers. Located after the passenger cabin are the AV broadcast room, toilets and gangways, while the other motor carriage has a snack bar instead of the AV room.

The NC3 uses a diesel-mechanical transmission, which powers the frontal bogie in each motor carriage, with the rear bogie being trailed and supporting the weight of the train. The diesel engine and mechanical transmission is installed directly on the bogie, and extends into the machinery room of the train.

See also 

 Ganz Works
 Ganz-MÁVAG
 DVM2
D1 multiple unit

References 

Ganz-Mavag multiple units
Diesel multiple units of China